Emil Krukowicz-Przedrzymirski also known as Emil Karol Przedrzymirski de Krukowicz (1886-1957) was a Polish general.
Krukowicz-Przedrzymirski was born in 1886. He began military service as an artillery officer in the Austro-Hungarian Army during World War I. He joined the Polish Army in 1918 and fought in the Polish Soviet War. During the war, Krukowicz-Przedrzymirski received the Virtuti Militari medal for valor. He was promoted to general in 1931. He served as the commander of the Army Modlin during the Invasion of Poland in 1939. He was captured by German troops and spent the rest of World War II as a prisoner. After being liberated by the Western Allies at the end of the war, he remained in emigration for the rest of his life (first in Great Britain, later in Canada). He died in 1957.

Personal life 
His brother was Henryk Krukowicz-Przedrzymirski, an artillery officer like Emil and a figure skater.

Honours and awards
 Silver Cross of the Virtuti Militari
 Officer's Cross of the Order of Polonia Restituta
 Gold Cross of Merit
 Commemorative Medal for War 1918-1921
 Regained Independence Medal of the Decade
 Silver Medal for Long Service
 Gold Badge of Honour Polish Combatants Association
 Commander's Cross of the Order of the Star of Romania
 Commander's Cross with Star of the Order of Merit of the Republic of Hungary

1886 births
1957 deaths
People from Lviv Oblast
People from the Kingdom of Galicia and Lodomeria
Polish generals
Austro-Hungarian military personnel of World War I
Polish people of the Polish–Soviet War
Recipients of the Silver Cross of the Virtuti Militari
Officers of the Order of Polonia Restituta
Recipients of the Gold Cross of Merit (Poland)
Commanders of the Order of the Star of Romania
Commander's Crosses with Star of the Order of Merit of the Republic of Hungary (civil)